This is a list of games for the Magnavox Odyssey 2 video game console.

Magnavox games

In the United States the following 47 game titles were released by Magnavox.

Alien Invaders - Plus!
Alpine Skiing!
Armored Encounter! / Subchase!
Attack of the Timelord! 🗣
Baseball!
Blockout! / Breakdown!
Bowling! / Basketball!
Casino Slot Machine!
Computer Intro!
Computer Golf!
Conquest of the World
Cosmic Conflict!
Dynasty!
Electronic Table Soccer!
Football!
Freedom Fighters!
Hockey! / Soccer!
Invaders from Hyperspace!
I've Got Your Number!
K.C.'s Krazy Chase! 🗣
K.C. Munchkin!
Keyboard Creations!
Killer Bees! 🗣
Las Vegas Blackjack!
Matchmaker! / Buzzword! / Logix!
Math-A-Magic! / Echo!
Monkeyshines!
Nimble Numbers Ned! 🗣
Out of this World! / Helicopter Rescue!
P.T. Barnum's Acrobats! 🗣
Pachinko!
Pick Axe Pete!
Pocket Billiards!
Power Lords
Quest for the Rings
Gunfighter / Showdown in 2100 A.D.
Sid the Spellbinder! 🗣
Smithereens! 🗣
Speedway! / Spin-out! / Cryptologic!
Take the Money and Run!
The Great Wall Street Fortune Hunt
Thunderball!
Turtles! 🗣
Type & Tell! 🗣
UFO!
Volleyball!
War of Nerves!

Only three games: Nimble Numbers Ned!, Power Lords and Sid the Spellbinder! were released on Odyssey 2, but not on Philips VideoPac.

Philips games

In the European market, each game released by Philips was assigned a number.

1978
 Race / Spin-Out / Cryptogram †
Pairs / Space Rendezvous / Logic 
American Football
Air-Sea War / Battle
Blackjack
Tenpin Bowling / Basketball
Mathematician / Echo
Baseball
Computer Programmer
Golf
Cosmic Conflict †

1979
Take the Money and Run
Playschool Maths
Gunfighter
Samurai
Depth Charge / Marksman

1980
Chinese Logic
Laser War
Catch The Ball / Noughts and Crosses
Stone Sling †
Secret of the Pharaohs
Space Monster †
Las Vegas Gambling
Flipper Game
Skiing
Basket Game
Electronic Table Football

1981
Electronic Volleyball
Dam Buster
Battlefield
Musician(with musical keyboard)
A Labyrinth Game / Supermind
Jumping Acrobats
Satellite Attack †
Electronic Billiards
Electronic Soccer / Electronic Ice Hockey

1982
Monkeyshines
Munchkin
Freedom Fighters
4 in 1 Row
Conquest of the World (with accompanying board game)
The Quest of the Rings(with accompanying board game)
Pickaxe Pete †
Crazy Chase
Morse
The Great Wall Street Fortune Hunt(with accompanying booklet and playing cards)
The Mousing Cat

1983
Backgammon
Turtles
Super Bee
Terrahawks †
Killer Bees †
Nightmare †
Loony Balloon †
Neutron Star †
Norseman ‡
Blobbers
Air Battle †
Helicopter Rescue ‡
Trans American Rally ‡

† = Available for both Videopac and Videopac+. Pre-1983 games were re-released with additional graphics.

‡ = Only available for Videopac+

Only released in Brazil
 Clay Pigeon!
 Comando Noturno!

Packaging
 The first 13 games were initially released in a glossy cardboard box with a black front cover.
 Then the first 26 games were (re-)released in a matte cardboard box with a black front cover.
 From 1980 onward, all games were (re-)released in a plastic case with a color graphics front cover.

Expansion modules
 C7010 Chess Module
 C7420 Home Computer Module
 The Voice Module 🗣

Third-party games

Parker
Frogger
Popeye
Q*bert
Super Cobra
Spider-Man (unreleased)
Tutankham (unreleased)

Imagic
Atlantis
Demon Attack

Regional Title Variations 
This is a sortable list of games released showing the difference in titles across various regions.     
    
Many games were released in several regions but often with different titles.  Canadian releases had the same title as US releases but were also titled in French on the packaging.

See also
Videopac G7000
Videopac G7200
Videopac G7400

References

Videopac